The 2011 Northwest Territories general election was held on October 3, 2011. Nineteen members were returned to the 17th Legislative Assembly from single member districts conducted under first-past-the-post voting system.

The territory operates on a consensus government system with no political parties; the premier is subsequently chosen by and from the Members of the Legislative Assembly (MLAs).

Three incumbent MLAs faced no challengers and were acclaimed back into office in their districts. Five new MLAs were elected, although only one defeated an incumbent; all of the other four won in open seats where the incumbent MLA did not run for re-election.

New Premier and cabinet
After the election the elected members of the Assembly will gather to choose the 12th Premier of the territories. Incumbent Premier Floyd Roland has chosen not to stand for re-election in his district. To date no Premier has served two full terms in the Northwest Territories since Frederick Haultain, who won his second term in 1902.

After the members of the legislature have elected the new Premier, the MLAs elect the cabinet ministers from the remaining Assembly members and the Premier then assigns portfolios to the new ministers.

Election summary

Districts and candidates

Note: Bold denotes a member of the cabinet and speaker of the Assembly, the Premier is denoted in bold italic.

References

External links
Elections NWT

2011 elections in Canada
Elections in the Northwest Territories
October 2011 events in Canada
2011 in the Northwest Territories